Kendem, or Bokwa-Kendem, is a minor Southern Bantoid language of the Mamfe family. It is spoken in three villages in Cameroon, Kendem, Kekpoti and Bokwa.

References

Mamfe languages
Languages of Cameroon